Nematopus indus is a species of insect from the genus Nematopus.

Range 
Nematopus indus has been observed and documented in Argentina, Bolivia, Brazil, Chile, French Guiana, Guyana, Suriname, Venezuela

Taxonomy 
Nematopus indus is part of the genus Nematopus, which consists of 30 species. This genus is one of the most diverse genera of Nematopodini
in the Western Hemisphere and is found primarily in the tropical and subtropical regions.

References

Fauna of Argentina
Fauna of Bolivia
Fauna of Brazil
Fauna of Chile
Fauna of French Guiana
Fauna of Guyana
Fauna of Suriname
Fauna of Venezuela
Taxa named by Carl Linnaeus
Coreidae